Arthromastix is a genus of moths of the family Crambidae. It contains only one species, Arthromastix lauralis, which is found in Central America (including Belize, Costa Rica), South America (including Brazil, Venezuela, Bolivia, Argentina), as well as the Dominican Republic and Cuba.

The forewings are yellowish white with a broad cupreous-brown border and a yellow marginal line.

The larvae feed on Trichostigma octandrum.

References

Spilomelinae
Monotypic moth genera
Moths of North America
Moths of South America
Crambidae genera
Taxa named by William Warren (entomologist)